The meridian 101° west of Greenwich is a line of longitude that extends from the North Pole across the Arctic Ocean, North America, the Pacific Ocean, the Southern Ocean, and Antarctica to the South Pole.

The 101st meridian west forms a great circle with the 79th meridian east.

From Pole to Pole
Starting at the North Pole and heading south to the South Pole, the 101st meridian west passes through:

{| class="wikitable plainrowheaders"
! scope="col" width="130" | Co-ordinates
! scope="col" | Country, territory or sea
! scope="col" | Notes
|-
| style="background:#b0e0e6;" | 
! scope="row" style="background:#b0e0e6;" | Arctic Ocean
| style="background:#b0e0e6;" |
|-
| style="background:#b0e0e6;" | 
! scope="row" style="background:#b0e0e6;" | Peary Channel
| style="background:#b0e0e6;" |
|-
| 
! scope="row" | 
| Nunavut — Ellef Ringnes Island
|-
| style="background:#b0e0e6;" | 
! scope="row" style="background:#b0e0e6;" | Danish Strait
| style="background:#b0e0e6;" |
|-
| 
! scope="row" | 
| Nunavut — King Christian Island
|-
| style="background:#b0e0e6;" | 
! scope="row" style="background:#b0e0e6;" | Unnamed waterbody
| style="background:#b0e0e6;" |
|-
| 
! scope="row" | 
| Nunavut — Helena Island
|-
| style="background:#b0e0e6;" | 
! scope="row" style="background:#b0e0e6;" | Sir William Parker Strait
| style="background:#b0e0e6;" |
|-
| style="background:#b0e0e6;" | 
! scope="row" style="background:#b0e0e6;" | May Inlet
| style="background:#b0e0e6;" |
|-
| 
! scope="row" | 
| Nunavut — Bathurst Island
|-
| style="background:#b0e0e6;" | 
! scope="row" style="background:#b0e0e6;" | Parry Channel
| style="background:#b0e0e6;" | Viscount Melville Sound
|-
| 
! scope="row" | 
| Nunavut — Prince of Wales Island
|-
| style="background:#b0e0e6;" | 
! scope="row" style="background:#b0e0e6;" | Ommanney Bay
| style="background:#b0e0e6;" |
|-
| 
! scope="row" | 
| Nunavut — Prince of Wales Island 
|-
| style="background:#b0e0e6;" | 
! scope="row" style="background:#b0e0e6;" | M'Clintock Channel
| style="background:#b0e0e6;" | Passing just west of Gateshead Island, Nunavut, 
|-
| 
! scope="row" | 
| Nunavut — Victoria Island and Qikiqtagafaaluk
|-
| style="background:#b0e0e6;" | 
! scope="row" style="background:#b0e0e6;" | Victoria Strait
| style="background:#b0e0e6;" |
|-
| style="background:#b0e0e6;" | 
! scope="row" style="background:#b0e0e6;" | Queen Maud Gulf
| style="background:#b0e0e6;" |
|-valign="top"
| 
! scope="row" | 
| Nunavut Manitoba — from 
|-valign="top"
| 
! scope="row" | 
| North Dakota South Dakota — from  Nebraska — from  Kansas — from  Oklahoma — from  Texas — from 
|-valign="top"
| 
! scope="row" | 
|-
| style="background:#b0e0e6;" | 
! scope="row" style="background:#b0e0e6;" | Pacific Ocean
| style="background:#b0e0e6;" |
|-
| style="background:#b0e0e6;" | 
! scope="row" style="background:#b0e0e6;" | Southern Ocean
| style="background:#b0e0e6;" |
|-
| 
! scope="row" | Antarctica
| Unclaimed territory
|-
|}

See also
100th meridian west
102nd meridian west

w101 meridian west